The Science Museum of the University of Coimbra (Museu da Ciência da Universidade de Coimbra) gathers the historical scientific collections of several units of the University of Coimbra, in Coimbra, Portugal. It includes the collection of scientific instruments from the 18th and 19th century of the Physics Museum, the collections of botanics, zoology, anthropology and mineralogy of the Natural History Museum, and the collections of the Astronomical Observatory and the Geophysical Institute of the University of Coimbra.

Formerly there were several museums in the university, including a museum of physics, a museum of zoology, a museum of natural history, and a museum of mineralogy and geology, which were managed by different university departments. They merged in 2006/2007 to form the Science Museum of the University of Coimbra.

Most of these collections date back to the reform of the University promoted by the Marquis of Pombal in 1772, where the teaching of the sciences took major importance, and are lodged in the contemporary buildings of the 18th century. This constitutes the most important science collection in Portugal and one of the most important ones in Europe.

External links
Official site
Science Museum University of Coimbra, Portugal

University of Coimbra
Museums in Coimbra District
Science museums in Portugal
Technology museums
Natural history museums in Portugal
Buildings and structures in Coimbra
Tourist attractions in Coimbra